Mouloudia Olympic of Constantine, known as MO Constantine or simply MOC for short, is an Algerian football club based in Constantine, founded in 1939 by the reformer Abd al Hamid Ben Badis. The club colors are White and blue. Their home stadium, Ramadane Ben Abdelmalek Stadium, has a capacity of 8,000 spectators. The club is currently playing in the Algerian Ligue 2.

On August 5, 2020, MO Constantine promoted to the Algerian Ligue 2.

Honours

National title

 Algerian Championnat National
Champions (1): 1991
Runners-up (3): 1972, 1974, 2000

 Algerian Cup
Runners-up (3): 1964, 1975, 1976

 Constantine League
Champion (2): 1940, 1949

International title
 Maghreb Cup Winners Cup
 Third (1): 1975

Performance in CAF competitions
 African Cup of Champions Clubs: 1 appearance
1992: Second Round
 CAF Cup: 1 appearance
2001 – Second Round
 African Cup Winners' Cup: 1 appearance
1977 – Second Round

Current squad

Notable players
Below are the notable former players who have represented MO Constantine in league and international competition since the club's foundation in 1939. To appear in the section below, a player must have played in at least 100 official matches for the club or represented the national team for which the player is eligible during his stint with MO Constantine or following his departure.

For a complete list of MO Constantine players, see :Category:MO Constantine players

  Réda Babouche
  Rabah Gamouh

Crests

References

External links

 
Football clubs in Algeria
MO Constantine
Algerian Ligue 2 clubs
Association football clubs established in 1939
MO Constantine
MO Constantine